Karen M. McManus is an American author of young adult fiction. She is most known for her first novel, One of Us Is Lying, which spent more than 130 weeks on the New York Times bestseller list. It received a starred review from Publishers Weekly. One of Us Is Lying was optioned as a pilot by NBC and the television adaption premiered on Peacock in October 2021. Its sequel, One of Us Is Next, received a starred review from Publishers Weekly. For Two Can Keep a Secret, which was McManus’ first standalone novel outside of the One of Us Is Lying trilogy, Kirkus Reviews gave it a starred review and named it one of the best books of 2019.

McManus attended College of the Holy Cross, earning a Bachelor’s Degree in English and Northeastern University, earning a Master’s Degree in Journalism. She lives in Cambridge, Massachusetts.

Works

One of Us Lying trilogy 

 One of Us Is Lying (Delacorte Press, 2017)
 One of Us Is Next (Delacorte Press, 2020)
One of Us Is Back (upcoming release; Delacorte Press, 2023)

Standalone novels 

 Two Can Keep a Secret (Delacorte Press, 2019)

 The Cousins (Delacorte Press, 2020)

 You'll Be the Death of Me (November 2021)

 Nothing More To Tell (Random House, 30 August 2022)

 Marple: Twelve New Stories (contributor to continuation collection authorised for Miss Marple (2022)

References

External links 

2019 interview with Publishers Weekly
2017 article in Publishers Weekly
2019 interview with Entertainment Weekly
2017 interview with The Boston Globe

21st-century American novelists
21st-century American women writers
American writers of young adult literature
American women novelists
College of the Holy Cross alumni
Living people
Northeastern University alumni
One of Us Is Lying
Writers from Cambridge, Massachusetts
1969 births